For the 1987 Vuelta a España, the field consisted of 179 riders; 88 finished the race.

By rider

By nationality

References

Further reading

 Cyclists
1987